Howard Sherwin (22 July 1911 – 20 May 1997) was an English cricketer who played first-class cricket for Derbyshire County Cricket Club in 1937.

Sherwin was born in Chesterfield. In the 1937 season he played one match for Derbyshire Second XI and one first-class match against Gloucestershire. He was not out in both innings, and bowled 11 overs without taking a wicket.

Sherwin was a left-handed batsman and played two innings in one first-class match scoring 12 runs in total without losing his wicket. He bowled 11 overs for no wickets at the cost of 32 runs.

Sherwin died at March, Cambridgeshire at the age of 85.

References

1911 births
1997 deaths
English cricketers
Derbyshire cricketers